Cost to company (CTC) is a term for the total salary package of an employee, used in countries such as India and South Africa. It indicates the total amount of expenses a company (organisation) spends on an employee during one year. It is calculated by adding salary to the cost of all additional benefits an employee receives during the service period. If an employee's salary is £50,000 and the company pays an additional £5,000 for their health insurance, the CTC is £55,000. Employees may not directly receive the CTC amount.

Difference between CTC and pay slips
The CTC can include many elements in addition to salary/wages, such as health care, pension and allowances for housing, travel and entertainment. Tax is also deducted from the cash amount the employee receives directly. The term CTC is used by companies to more accurately reflect the incremental spend per employee (the concept of Direct Cost) from the perspective of an organisation. Another way to look at CTC is: all the money that would not need to be spent if the number of employees is reduced by one. Obviously, the indirect cost like the cost of  facility, the support teams like HR, IT, Management, etc would still be incurred and hence not included in CTC? Therefore, the CTC should not include any component, that can not be attributed directly to the employee.
A hypothetical breakdown of CTC is given below:

Break up of take home salary:

If a company provides an annual performance based variable payout (also known as a bonus or commission), this will also get included in the CTC. The variable payout is usually a certain percentage of Gross Salary and typically varies from 5% - 30%. Since it is performance based, the employee may be eligible for anywhere from 50% to 150% of their variable payout based on their performance for the year.

In India, the CTC is usually expressed as LPA (Lakhs Per Annum).  Other terms in common use are CCTC (Current CTC) and ECTC (Expected CTC).  A common ratio used by many recruiters is the CTC to Total Experience.  For example, a person with 4 years of experience earning 6 LPA has a ratio of 6/4 = 1.5

References

See also
Employment

Employment compensation